The Florida Law Review is a bimonthly law review published by the University of Florida's Fredric G. Levin College of Law. The review was established in 1948 as the University of Florida Law Review and it assumed its current name in 1989. It is produced by about eighty student members and two staff assistants. The journal publishes articles, essays, and lectures.

Abstracting and indexing
The journal is abstracted and indexed in EBSCO databases, HeinOnline, and ProQuest databases.

References

External links

American law journals
General law journals
University of Florida
Publications established in 1948
Bimonthly journals
English-language journals
1948 establishments in Florida